Lophophora  is a genus of moths of the family Noctuidae.

Species
 Lophophora clanymoides
 Lophophora evan
 Lophophora latipennis
 Lophophora polycyma
 Lophophora thaumasalis

References
Natural History Museum Lepidoptera genus database

Herminiinae